"Making Time" is a song by English rock band The Creation, and it was released as their debut single in 1966. It was written by Kenny Pickett (lead singer) and Eddie Phillips. The lyrics portray the experience of working in a clock factory while co-workers listen to their favorites on the radio. The song features an electric guitar played with a violin bow.

Cover versions
The song has been covered by Das Damen, Little Free Rock, Television Personalities, and Green Bullfrog. You Am I released a version of the song on "Beat Party!", a bonus disc that came with initial copies of their album Hourly, Daily.

The single's B-side "Try and Stop Me" was covered by The Radiators from Space on their 1979 "Let's Talk About the Weather" single.

The hardcore punk band Circle Jerks covered the song on their Live Album “Gig”, recorded at the end of the 80s and launched in 1992.

Use in other media
It was featured on the soundtrack of the 1998 film Rushmore and in an Xfinity TV commercial in 2017. It was also used in an Audi USA commercial in 2018. Since 2017, it has been the theme song of The Great Pottery Throw Down.

References 
The mid-1980s band Makin' Time was named after the song.

References

External links
"Making Time" at www.discogs.com

1966 debut singles
Song recordings produced by Shel Talmy
1966 songs